Muhammed Emin Ergin (born 24 April 2001) is a Turkish footballer who plays as a winger for TFF Third League club Sapanca Gençlikspor on loan from Sivasspor.

Career
A youth product of Kocasinan Şimşekspor, Ergin moved to Sivasspor on 9 August 2019. He made his professional debut with Sivasspor in a 4–0 Süper Lig win over Hatayspor on 28 November 2021.

References

External links
 

2001 births
People from Kayseri
Living people
Turkish footballers
Association football wingers
Sivasspor footballers
İskenderun FK footballers
Süper Lig players
TFF Third League players